Hans Dieter Zingraff (born 1947 in Karlsruhe) is a German artist in constructivism. He was born in Karlsruhe, Germany in 1947 as the son of an electrical engineer. Zingraff showed an early interest in the arts, in particular in trompe-l'œil, the optical illusion technique.

In Spain
In 1972 he moved to Dénia, Spain, creating a number of critically noticed works in the surrealist style. He continued to paint purely abstract including architectural still lives in mixed media collage. In 1984 he started experimenting on wood strip images, while conversely, seemingly glued pieces of photography were actually painted.

The 1980s
In the years 1983 to 1985 Zingraff managed a crucial step in the current local art scene. As an absolute novice, in 1983 one of his pictures was  selected by the jury of the 50th Salon de Otoño (Association of Spanish Painters and Sculptors) in Madrid. After a period of soft lines and shapes, he returned to the hard line.

Zingraff's Constructivism
From 1996, Zingraff themed the removal of spatial continuity and visual ambiguity radically abstract. In 1999 he developed his personal style. He brought his compositions now effectively out of the area and out of the traditional format. Depth, volume and lighting are since there no longer painted illusions, but a tangible reality. Wall and space are included in the works, back-mounted lights give real light and shadow. Despite his many exhibitions Zingraff continuously creates new works. In recent years, his works were exposed in New York, Lima (Peru), Madrid, Berlin, artKarlsruhe, and Cairo.

Awards and honors
1st Prize in the competition "Minicuadros, Elda (Alicante) in 1981
3rd Medal of the 51st Salon de Otoño (Association of Spanish Painters and Sculptors) in the Cultural Center of Madrid (Centro Cultural de la Villa de Madrid) in 1984
2nd Medal of the 52nd Salon de Otoño in 1985
"Galerias Preciado"-Price, 23 Exhibition of San Isidro, Madrid
Medal of OMJET (Cairo)
Artes Plasticas Convocatoria 2005 and 2006, Government of Alicante

Works (selection)
Works in museums
 Foundation, Camilo José Cela, Iria Flavia, Padron. (A Coruña)
 Museum of Contemporary Art in Vilafamés
 Museum of Guinea Ecuatorial
 Museum of La Rioja, Logroño
 Museum of OMJET, Tunis
 Museum of Contemporary Art in Elx (Elche)
 Museum of Contemporary Graphic Art in Marbella
 Museum of Contemporary Art, Marbella
 Art Gallery of OMJET (Cairo)
 Exma. Diputación de Alicante, Alicante

Solo Exhibitions and International Art Fairs
 1990: Quorum Gallery, Madrid; Gallery Sureste, Granada
 1991: Gallery de Palau, Valencia (also 1998, 2003, 2006 and 2009)
 1992: Gallery del Coleccionista, Madrid
 1995: Gallery "Henry", Pau (France)
 2001: Galeria Alahdros, Ibiza, Atlantica Gallery, A Coruña, Galicia
 2003: Gallery Pilar Mulet, Madrid
 2005: Government Alicante, Museo de Bellas Artes Gravina
 2006: Castle d'Porto Mos, Portugal, Gallery Palais Munck, Karlsruhe, Town Hall of Calpe
 2007: Egyptian Institute of Madrid, Gallery Carmen Carrión, Santander, Centro de Arte Atlantica, A Coruña
 2008: Gezira Art Center, Cairo, Egypt; Center of Creativity, Alexandria, Egypt; Fiart, Valencia, Museum of the Government of Cáceres
 2009: Santa Barbara Castle, Alicante; Art Karlsruhe, One man show

Joint exhibitions and competitions
 1990: 1st Biennale of Almeria, Almería.
 1991: Cultural Center "Conde Duque," Homage to the town hall of Madrid Camilo José Cela
 1992: X. Bienal Internacional del Deporte en las Bellas Artes, Barcelona
 1998: XVII Certamen de Pintura, "Eusebio Sempere," Art al `Hotel, Valencia, Galerie Palais Munck, Karlsruhe.
 2001: Casa Vieira Guimaraes, Tomar, Cidade Templaria, Portugal
 2002: MAI, Salamanca, European Capital of Culture
 2003: Viaje de Papel (Para Cuba-dos), Universitat Politecnica de Valencia, Museum of Art & Culture de Lescar, Lescar, France
 2004: Museum Cantanhede Exposición Quorum
 2005: Grupo MAI, Galerie des Arenes, Bayonne, France, Painter of the Mediterranean, MUBAG, Alicante Provincial Government, National Museum, Lima, Peru, Lladro Museum, New York, 57th Street, Galerie & Edition René Steiner, Erlach, Switzerland * 2008: Colors and shapes, museum la Rioja, Logroño
 2009: Gallery "La Caja China", Seville

Literature

Sources

External links
 Website of Hans Dieter Zingraff
 Article about Hans Dieter Zingraff in laverdad.es
 Hans Dieter Zingraff in Atlantica Centro Do Arte
 Hans Dieter Zingraff in Arte in Alicante
 Hans Dieter Zingraff in art49.com

Living people
1947 births
Artists from Karlsruhe